Soziologie  is a 1956–1958 book by Eugen Rosenstock-Huessy (1888–1973), German social philosopher, addressing the spatial and temporal influences on “human life, language and associations. To Rosenstock-Huessy, speech is central to sociology; sociology must recognize that speech is the concrete form of social reality.”
Although it is Rosenstock-Huessy’s most systematic work. His Soziologie, has never been translated into English. It is a work that he revised periodically throughout his adult life. The book has two volumes, Band I: Die Übermacht der Räume (Volume 1: Obsession with Spaces) and Band II: Die Vollzahl der Zeiten (Volume 2: The Full Count of Times). Peter Leithart writes on "The Relevance of Eugen Rosenstock-Huessy" and his methods:

Overview
The two volumes are in three parts. In Part 1, Rosenstock-Huessy addresses the areas of existence in which people confront serious life, such as marriage or service in war. “He says that important human experiences like these are created by human powers like enthusiasm, love, or faith. He then contrasts these life-changing, deeply rooted experiences in time and space with the abstract concepts, space and time. He sees these human powers as the concrete forces which create timespans, and so create and structure history.” In Part 2, he treats history as one part of each person’s soul and thereby a major influence individuals’ actions. Recurring historical events and times constitute both people’s individual and combined experiences. In Part 3, he addresses people living together and how they create communities and social structures.

References

External links 
 The official web site of the Eugen Rosenstock-Huessy Fund and Argo Books includes a biography, accessed 20 March 2007
 The Norwich Center, Norwich, Vermont, maintains an internet site devoted to an introductory biography and appreciation of Eugen Rosenstock-Huessy, signed by Clinton C. Gardner, President of the Norwich Center, accessed 20 March 2007
Eugen Rosenstock-Huessy Gesellschaft

1956 non-fiction books
German non-fiction books
Philosophy books